The 1990 World Junior Ice Hockey Championships (1990 WJHC) was the 14th edition of the Ice Hockey World Junior Championship and was held mainly in Helsinki, Finland.  Canada won the gold medal, its fourth world junior championship, while the Soviet Union and Czechoslovakia won silver and bronze, respectively.

Final standings
The 1990 tournament was a round-robin format, with the top three teams winning gold, silver and bronze medals respectively.

Poland was relegated to Pool B for 1991.

Results

Scoring leaders

Tournament awards

Pool B
Eight teams contested the second tier this year in Bad Tölz West Germany from March 26 to April 4.  It was played in a simple round robin format, each team playing seven games.

Standings

Switzerland was promoted to Pool A and Yugoslavia was relegated to Pool C for 1991.

Pool C
Pool C was contested by seven teams in Eindhoven Netherlands from March 16 to 25.  The South Korean juniors made their debut this year.

Standings

The Netherlands was promoted to Pool B for 1991.

References

 
1990 World Junior Hockey Championships at TSN
 Results at Passionhockey.com

World Junior Ice Hockey Championships
World Junior Ice Hockey Championships
International ice hockey competitions hosted by Finland
World Junior Ice Hockey Championships
World Junior Ice Hockey Championships
International sports competitions in Turku
International sports competitions in Helsinki
1980s in Helsinki
1990s in Helsinki
1990s in Turku
Kerava
Sport in Kauniainen
International sports competitions hosted by West Germany
World Junior Ice Hockey Championships
1990s in Bavaria
Sports competitions in Bavaria
1990 in West German sport
World Junior Ice Hockey Championships
Sports competitions in Eindhoven
20th century in Eindhoven
1989–90 in Dutch ice hockey
International ice hockey competitions hosted by the Netherlands